Stuart Appleby (born 1 May 1971) is an Australian professional golfer who plays on the PGA Tour Champions. He was a nine-time winner on the PGA Tour.

Early life
Appleby was born in Cohuna, Victoria, and grew up on a nearby dairy farm. He began in golf by hitting balls from paddock to paddock after his farm chores were completed. As a youth, he played Australian rules football.

Professional career

Early career
Appleby turned professional in 1992 and began his career on the PGA Tour of Australasia. In 1995 he won twice on the Nike Tour (now known as the Web.com Tour), the second tier men's tour in the U.S. He was the eighth player to win his first Web.com Tour start. He qualified to compete on the PGA Tour the following year by finishing the season fifth on the money list.

PGA Tour

Appleby has won nine times on the PGA Tour. He was a member of the International Team in the Presidents Cup five times, and featured in the top ten of the Official World Golf Ranking in 2004. His best performance in a major championship came in 2002, where he lost in a four-way playoff to Ernie Els at The Open Championship.

In 2010, during the final round of the inaugural Greenbrier Classic, Appleby became the fifth player in history to shoot a 59 in an official PGA Tour event, and won the PGA Tour Comeback Player of the Year award.
Appleby was limited to seven starts before back surgery in March 2015. He made a start on the Web.com Tour for the first time in twenty years at the Nova Scotia Open, where he finished T36. Qualified for a medical extension, Appleby was allowed entry into the Web.com Tour Finals, but did not make a cut and played the 2016 season on a major medical extension. He burned through his medical extension and finished 143rd in the FedEx Cup. He tried to regain his Tour card through the Web.com Finals, but did not finish high enough when Hurricane Matthew threatened Florida and the final tournament was cancelled, leaving the top 25 players with their cards, and Appleby finished 31st, leaving him with limited status for the 2017 season. He finished 192nd in the FedEx Cup, limiting him to the Past Champions category for 2018.

Personal life
Appleby's first wife Renay was struck and killed by a taxicab outside London Waterloo station in 1998, shortly after he had missed the cut at The Open Championship.

Appleby married his second wife, Ashley Saleet, in 2002, and they live with their four children in Orlando, Florida. After the 1999 plane crash that killed his friend and next-door neighbour Payne Stewart, he has been one of the key father figures for Stewart's children, Chelsea and Aaron. In his spare time, Appleby enjoys motor racing. He is the ambassador for Golf Australia's Crown Lager Social Golf Club and patron for Stuart Appleby Junior Golf.

Professional wins (20)

PGA Tour wins (9)

PGA Tour playoff record (2–1)

PGA Tour of Australasia wins (3)

Nike Tour wins (2)

Nike Tour playoff record (1–1)

Australasian Foundation Tour wins (5)
1991 Queensland Open (as an amateur)
1994 Victorian PGA Championship, Tasmanian Classic, South Australian PGA Championship, Nedlands Masters

Other wins (1)

Results in major championships

CUT = missed the half-way cut
"T" = tied

Summary

Most consecutive cuts made – 6 (2007 PGA – 2009 Masters)
Longest streak of top-10s – 1 (four times)

Results in The Players Championship

CUT = missed the halfway cut
"T" indicates a tie for a place

Results in World Golf Championships

1Cancelled due to 9/11

QF, R16, R32, R64 = Round in which player lost in match play
"T" = Tied
NT = No tournament
Note that the HSBC Champions did not become a WGC event until 2009.

Note: Appleby is the only golfer to compete in the first 32 WGC events.

Team appearances
Amateur
Sloan Morpeth Trophy (representing Australia): 1992
Australian Men's Interstate Teams Matches (representing Victoria): 1991, 1992

Professional
World Cup (representing Australia): 1996, 2003, 2009
Alfred Dunhill Cup (representing Australia): 1997, 1998
Presidents Cup (International Team): 1998 (winners), 2000, 2003 (tie), 2005, 2007

See also
1995 Nike Tour graduates
1996 PGA Tour Qualifying School graduates
Lowest rounds of golf

References

External links

Australian male golfers
PGA Tour of Australasia golfers
PGA Tour golfers
Korn Ferry Tour graduates
Sportsmen from Victoria (Australia)
Golfers from Orlando, Florida
1971 births
Living people